Jack Blackwell (28 October 1909 – 25 October 2001) was an English footballer who played at inside-forward for Huddersfield Town, Charlton Athletic, Port Vale, Boston United, Ipswich Town, and Bridlington Town. He helped Ipswich to the Southern League title in 1936–37.

Career
Blackwell played for Chapel-en-le-Frith, before joining Huddersfield Town in October 1931. He appeared in two First Division games in 1931–32 and featured once at Leeds Road in 1932–33. He finished the season though with Charlton Athletic, who were relegated out of the Second Division in last place. The "Addicks" finished fifth in the Third Division South in 1933–34, but Blackwell had already left The Valley for Port Vale in February 1934. He scored a brace on his debut in a 5–1 win over Millwall at The Old Recreation Ground on 24 February. However, he only found the net once in the remaining eleven games of the 1933–34 campaign. He picked up a serious knee injury in August 1934, which sidelined him for four months. He never regained his first team spot and was instead released in May 1935, having scored twice in 12 games in 1934–35. He spent the 1935–36 season at York Street with non-league Boston United. He spent the 1936–37 season with Ipswich Town; scoring 15 goals in 28 games across all competitions, he helped the "Tractor Boys" to win the Southern League title. After leaving Portman Road, he later appeared for Bridlington Town.

Career statistics
Source:

Honours
Ipswich Town
Southern Football League: 1936–37

References

1909 births
2001 deaths
People from Ecclesall
Footballers from Sheffield
English footballers
Association football forwards
Huddersfield Town A.F.C. players
Charlton Athletic F.C. players
Port Vale F.C. players
Boston United F.C. players
Ipswich Town F.C. players
Bridlington Town A.F.C. players
English Football League players
Southern Football League players
Midland Football League players